El Coco is a corregimiento in Penonomé District, Coclé Province, Panama with a population of 5,605 as of 2010. Its population as of 1990 was 3,558; its population as of 2000 was 4,592.

References

Corregimientos of Coclé Province